Joshua Christian Nanai (born 5 November 2002), better known as Jawsh 685, is a New Zealand beat maker and music producer. While a student at Manurewa High School, in South Auckland, New Zealand, he made his breakthrough with the 2020 siren jam single "Savage Love (Laxed – Siren Beat)" in collaboration with American R&B singer Jason Derulo. BTS made a remix to the song which reached number one in over 15 countries, including the United States, the United Kingdom, Canada, Australia, and New Zealand.

Early life and career 
Nanai was born and raised in South Auckland, and currently lives in Manurewa. He is of mixed Pacific Islander descent: half-Samoan and half-Cook Islander. The "685" in his stage name refers to the calling code for Samoa. He became the first Pasifika and the third New Zealander ever to top the UK Singles Chart.

Discography

Singles

Awards and nominations

Notes

References 

2002 births
Living people
People educated at Manurewa High School
21st-century New Zealand musicians
Musicians from Auckland
New Zealand people of Cook Island descent
New Zealand people of Samoan descent
New Zealand record producers
Child pop musicians